Zabel Point (‘Nos Zabel’ \'nos 'za-bel\) is the ice-covered, rock-tipped point on the southwest side of the entrance to Buragara Cove on the west coast of Brabant Island in the Palmer Archipelago, Antarctica.  It was formed as a result of the retreat of Rush Glacier near the start of the 21st century.

The point is named after the settlement of Zabel in Western Bulgaria.

Location

Maps
 Antarctic Digital Database (ADD). Scale 1:250000 topographic map of Antarctica. Scientific Committee on Antarctic Research (SCAR). Since 1993, regularly upgraded and updated.
British Antarctic Territory. Scale 1:200000 topographic map. DOS 610 Series, Sheet W 64 62. Directorate of Overseas Surveys, Tolworth, UK, 1980.
Brabant Island to Argentine Islands. Scale 1:250000 topographic map. British Antarctic Survey, 2008.

References
 Bulgarian Antarctic Gazetteer. Antarctic Place-names Commission. (details in Bulgarian, basic data in English)
 Zabel Point. SCAR Composite Antarctic Gazetteer.

External links
 Zabel Point. Copernix satellite image

Headlands of the Palmer Archipelago
Bulgaria and the Antarctic